is a railway station in Naie, Sorachi District,  Hokkaidō, Japan.

Lines
Hokkaido Railway Company
Hakodate Main Line Station A18

Adjacent stations

Railway stations in Hokkaido Prefecture
Railway stations in Japan opened in 1891